Highway 335 is a highway in the Canadian province of Saskatchewan. It runs from Highway 6 near Gronlid to Highway 23 west of Arborfield.

Highway 335 passes near the communities of Gronlid, Armley, and Nicklen, and also intersects Highway 681 and Highway 35. The intersection with Highway 35 was the scene of a 2018 collision resulting in 16 fatalities of the Humboldt Broncos, a team of the Saskatchewan Junior Hockey League.

Major intersections
From south to north:

References

335